Ricardo Margaleff (born Ricardo Margaleff García; January 1, 1977, in Mexico D.F., Mexico) is a Mexican actor known for his roles in Al diablo con los guapos, Una familia de diez, Llena de amor and Porque el amor manda.

Personal life
On March 3, 2012, he married Annush Hanessian in an intimate ceremony accompanied by family and friends.

Filmography

Television

Film

Awards and nominations

TVyNovelas Awards

References

External links

Male actors from Mexico City
Living people
Mexican male film actors
Mexican male telenovela actors
1977 births